Tankersley may refer to:

Buildings 

 Tankersley Tavern, Virginia
 Tankersley-Stewart House, Arkansas

Places
 Tankersley, South Yorkshire
 Tankersley, Texas

People
Bazy Tankersley, horse breeder and publisher of the Washington Times-Herald
 Cordrea Tankersley (born 1993), American football player
 Dennis Tankersley (born 1979), American baseball pitcher for the Washington Nationals
Kathleen Tankersley Young (1903–1933), American poet
Jan Tankersley, American politician
Leo Tankersley (1901–1980), American baseball catcher
Paul Tankersley, fictional character in the Honorverse
 Richie Tankersley Cusick (born 1952), American author
Samuel Tankersley Williams (1897–1984), American army general
 Taylor Tankersley (born 1983), American baseball pitcher for the New York Mets